Apna or APNA can mean:
 Apna, Armenia village in Aragatsotn Province of Armenia
 APNA, Atkins Park Neighborhood Association
 Apna (New Zealand), a New Zealand television channel and radio station
 Apna Channel, regional television station in Pakistan
 Apna Dal
 Association des professionnels navigants de l'aviation, French association of professional aviation aircrew
 APNA, American Psychiatric Nurses Association